William Duggan may refer to:

Willie Duggan (1950–2017), Irish rugby union player
Billy Duggan (1884–1934), Australian trade unionist

See also
William Dugan (disambiguation)
Duggan (surname)